Tsunoda is a Japanese surname. 

Notable people with the surname include:

People
 Fusako Tsunoda (19142010), Japanese writer
 Joyce Sachiko Tsunoda (born 1938), Japanese-American college administrator
, Japanese basketball player
 Kazuo Tsunoda (1918–2013), Japanese fighter pilot
, Japanese table tennis player
 Narumi Tsunoda (born 1962), Japanese voice actor
 Ryūsaku Tsunoda (1877–1964), Japanese Japanologist
 Tomoshige Tsunoda, major in the Imperial Japanese Military
 Tadanobu Tsunoda, Japanese author
, Japanese racing driver

Characters
 Tsunoda, a fictional character from the manga The Strange Tale of Panorama Island

See also

 

Japanese-language surnames